Doğan Recep Andaç (1 January 1922 to 6 February 2013) was a Turkish professional football manager.

Managerial career
Andaç had a couple brief stints managing the Turkey national football team. He was briefly the president of the Turkish Football Federation in 1980. He died on 13 February 2013, and was buried in Ankara, Turkey.

References

External links
Mackolik Profile
Sport.de profile

1922 births
2013 deaths
Turkish football managers
Turkey national football team managers
Süper Lig managers
Diyarbakırspor managers
Beşiktaş J.K. managers